Kevin Francis is a British film and television producer.

He has worked in the cinema as a production manager and producer and in television as a producer and executive producer. He founded the production company Tyburn Film Productions Limited. His father was cinematographer and film director Freddie Francis.

Filmography
 And Now for Something Completely Different (1971) (production manager) ...  Monty Python's And Now for Something Completely Different (UK: complete title)
 Persecution (1974) (producer) ... a.k.a. Sheba, The Graveyard, The Terror of Sheba
 The Ghoul (1975) (producer) ... a.k.a. The Thing in the Attic
 Legend of the Werewolf (1975) (producer) 
 The Masks of Death (1984) (executive producer)
 Murder Elite (1985) (executive producer)
 Peter Cushing: A One-Way Ticket to Hollywood (1989) (executive producer)

References

External links

Year of birth missing (living people)
Living people
Francis, Freddie